Old School Prankstas is the debut album by New Zealand hip-hop group, 3 The Hard Way released in 1995.

Track listing
Intro Here It Is
Rock Tha Nation
Many Rivers
Bass Freak
Cheech Interlude
All Around
Dialog Interlude
DJs Nightmare
Hip Hop Holiday featuring Bobbylon
What I Gotta Do featuring Larry Killip
Coming At Ya (Remix)
Dialog Interlude
Everyday
Get Down
Gotta Do (Shout Outs)

3 the Hard Way albums
1995 albums